Ananteris pydanieli is a species of scorpion from the Brazilian Amazon rainforest.  It is a member of the family Buthidae.

References

Buthidae
Animals described in 1982
Scorpions of South America